Theology on Tap is a program of lectures sponsored by a number of local Catholic dioceses. The lectures, which are often given by noted spiritual leaders and religious academics, address current topics in religion and theology, and are notable and sometimes controversial for their venue, which is normally a bar or restaurant.  The concept has become common among other Christian Denominations, particularly Episcopalians, Lutherans, Anglicans, and some Presbyterian and Methodist churches.

History
The series was cofounded by Father John Cusick, a resident of Old St. Patrick's Parish, and director of the archdiocese's Young Adult Minister and Father Jack Wall in June 1981 in Arlington Heights, Illinois, as the result of comments made by a recent college graduate who was "concerned about his personal identity and finding meaning in life."

Lecture topics have included the sacrament of reconciliation (commonly referred to as confession), Christian values, faith and work, relationship issues, small faith communities, decision making or discernment, embryonic stem-cell research, religious fundamentalism, the relevance of the church in the modern world and to public policy, and women's role in the church.

Reach
Since its inception, the program has spread to more than 180 parishes and dioceses and at least six other countries, including Canada, Italy, Taiwan, the Philippines, Ireland, Australia and Hong Kong.

As of Spring 2007, the Archdiocese of Chicago began a collaboration with RENEW International, a Catholic ministry organization, to expand and service Theology on Tap efforts in dioceses and parishes in the US and abroad.

Controversy
Theology on Tap exhibits significant theological differences with some churches and temperance societies like the Woman's Christian Temperance Union (compare Christianity and alcohol). Individual critics have noted that the atmosphere of alcohol-serving establishments does not necessarily complement the somberness and respect imposed by traditional church settings. Advocates for Theology on Tap, however, have defended the concept, calling it, among other things, the practice of "bringing the faith to where the people are." The fact that the lectures are open to the public is also hoped to bring in a broad audience; one organizer has stated that the goal of the lectures is "to reach out to people primarily in their 20s and 30s that may have strayed from their faith."

Notable advocates
At least one high-level church leader has embraced the idea with a sense of humor. On October 17, 2006, Washington Archbishop Donald Wuerl responded to a Theology on Tap gathering's applause by saying "That's the warmest welcome I've ever received in a pub ... That's the first welcome I've ever received in a pub."

Cardinals Justin Rigali, Joseph Bernardin, Francis George, Seán Patrick O'Malley, George Pell and Archbishops J. Peter Sartain and George Hugh Niederauer have also led and/or addressed program gatherings.

References

External links
 Theology on Tap: A young adult ministry of RENEW International
 Holiness on Tap: Rigali discusses being an English-language translator for three popes

Catholicism-related controversies
Christian theological lectures
Catholic education
Catholic Church in the United States
Recurring events established in 1981